Dolichostyrax tuberculatus is a species of beetle in the family Cerambycidae. It was described by Warren Samuel Fisher in 1936. It is known from Indonesia.

References

Morimopsini
Beetles described in 1936